San Nazario may refer to:
 San Nazario, Veneto
 The Italian form of Nazarius
 The church of San Nazaro in Brolo